Terry Joseph McDavitt  (born 2 January 1948) is a New Zealand educator, politician and activist.

Biography

Early life
Terry McDavitt was born in Dannevirke in 1948. He was educated in Wellington at St. Patrick's College, later attending Victoria University of Wellington and graduated in 1970 with a Master of Arts degree. He was an activist in his youth and organised multiple protests against the Vietnam War and apartheid. In 1979 he became head of General Studies at Wellington Polytech, a position he retained until 1987, when he resigned to focus on his political career.

McDavitt married Kate Ford in 1970 and had two children; Ruth in 1975 and Joseph in 1978. He and Ford were divorced in 1984. McDavitt married Sue Lee in 1994.

Political career
McDavitt became politically active in the early 1970s and joined the environmentalist Values Party. in 1974 he stood unsuccessfully for the Wellington City Council on a Values ticket. He also served as the General Secretary of the Values Party from 1974 until 1979 when he decided to leave the party.

By the 1980s McDavitt had left the Values Party and had joined the Labour Party. He stood again for the City Council in 1983 on a Labour ticket and was elected. He transferred to the Lambton Ward in 1986 would remain on the council until 1992 when he decided not to seek re-election. In 1988 he was appointed deputy to Mayor Jim Belich, holding that position until 1989 when Labour lost their majority on the council.

In 1989 he was elected to the Wellington Regional Council on a Labour ticket, chairing the transport committee, and would serve for 21 years until he was defeated in 2010 standing as an independent. He was the chair of both the public transport and land transport committees and also served  as Deputy Chair of the Regional Council from 2001 to 2007.

Notes

References

External links
 Photo of McDavitt (left) as Values Party secretary

|-

1948 births
Victoria University of Wellington alumni
Deputy mayors of Wellington
Wellington regional councillors
Wellington City Councillors
Values Party politicians
New Zealand Labour Party politicians
Living people
New Zealand justices of the peace